The Government of Dubai Media Office (GDMO) is an entity which is part of the Dubai government. It is responsible for implementing strategic communication plans for the Government of Dubai as well as disseminating government-related news in cooperation with local government agencies. It was established in 2010 under Law No (2) of 2010 issued by Vice President and Prime Minister of the UAE and Ruler of Dubai His Highness Sheikh Mohammed bin Rashid Al Maktoum and in 2013 there was a major restructuring

History 
The GDMO was established to handle the media affairs of the ruling family of Dubai, and over the years its role expanded towards PR and news production leading up to it being officially established as a Government entity in 2010.

Corporate structure and sub-entities 
The Director General of the GDMO is Mona Ghanem Al Marri, under which there are 7 departments and 2 sub entities: The Dubai Press Club and Brand Dubai.

Departments

Corporate support 
This department is in charge of HR & Finance related matters of the organization.

News Center 
The News Center's major role is to produce all of the news content related to the royal family for print, TV and online publications.

Media services 
Media Services takes care of Social Media and creative content production.

Strategic media affairs 
Manages all of the strategic communications work related to the government of Dubai.

Strategy Management and Governance 
Manages all of the internal organization's strategic objectives.

Sub-entities

Dubai Press Club 
An association for Journalists and media professionals founded in November 1999 by Mohammed bin Rashid Al Maktoum and was based in Dubai Media City in Dubai, United Arab Emirates. It launched the Arab Media Forum and the Arab Journalism Award. In 2010, it was merged under DGMO.

Brand Dubai 
Brand Dubai is a newly formed initiative which is the creative arm of the GDMO, it has role in beautifying the city through public art projects and events like Dubai Canvas.

Headquarters 
The GDMO is based in Convention Tower at the Dubai World Trade Center in the city of Dubai, United Arab Emirates.

Services and Activities 
The GDMO mainly serves the affairs of the ruling family of Dubai and the Dubai Government, but creating and distributing various content through multiple media platforms.

References 

Government of Dubai